The British Institute of Innkeeping (BII) is the professional body for individuals working in the licensed retail industry in the UK. This primarily includes pubs and bars.

Background 
The BII is a registered charity and membership organisation whose remit is to raise professional standards across the sector.  BII is the trading name of the British Institute of Innkeeping a private company limited by guarantee and registered in England as a charity.

Benefits 
The BII operates in Scotland, North, Yorkshire, North West & North Wales, East Midlands, East of England, West Midlands & South Wales, London, South East, South West.

The BII offers free expert helplines in HR, legal, licensing, Tax, Environmental Health (including Covid) & Landlord Relations,  online knowledge bank of business tools and market knowledge. The BII sends a weekly e newsletter, quarterly magazine, and fortnightly Marketplace e-shot to members.

References 

Bartending
Hospitality industry in the United Kingdom
Hospitality industry organizations
Organisations based in Surrey
Organizations established in 1981
Professional associations based in the United Kingdom